Acer campestre, known as the field maple, is a flowering plant species in the family Sapindaceae. It is native to much of continental Europe, Britain, southwest Asia from Turkey to the Caucasus, and north Africa in the Atlas Mountains. It has been widely planted, and is introduced outside its native range in Europe and areas of USA and Western Australia with suitable climate.

Description
The shoots are brown, with dark brown winter buds.

The two varieties, not accepted as distinct by all authorities, are:
Acer campestre var. campestre - downy fruit
Acer campestre var. leiocarpum (Opiz) Wallr. (syn. A. campestre subsp. leiocarpum) - hairless fruit

The closely related Acer miyabei replaces it in eastern Asia.

Distribution
The native range of field maple includes much of Europe, including Denmark, Poland and Belarus, England north to southern Scotland (where it is the only native maple), southwest Asia from Turkey to the Caucasus, and north Africa in the Atlas Mountains. In many areas, the original native range is obscured by widespread planting and introductions.<ref name=BRCBSBI>{{cite web |title=Online atlas of the British and Irish flora, Acer campestre (Field maple) |url=https://www.brc.ac.uk/plantatlas/index.php?q=plant/acer-campestre |publisher=Biological Records Centre and Botanical Society of Britain and Ireland }}</ref> In North America it is known as hedge maple and in Australia, it is sometimes called common maple. In Nottinghamshire, England it was known locally as dog oak.

Ecology
Field maple is an intermediate species in the ecological succession of disturbed areas; it typically is not among the first trees to colonise a freshly disturbed area, but instead seeds in under the existing vegetation. It is very shade-tolerant during the initial stages of its life, but it has higher light requirements during its seed-bearing years. It exhibits rapid growth initially, but is eventually overtaken and replaced by other trees as the forest matures. It is most commonly found on neutral to alkaline soils, but more rarely on acidic soil.

Diseases include a leaf spot fungus Didymosporina aceris, a mildew Uncinula bicornis, a canker Nectria galligena, and verticillium wilt Verticillium alboatrum. The leaves are also sometimes damaged by gall mites in the genus Aceria, and the aphid Periphyllus villosus.

Cultivation
The field maple is widely grown as an ornamental tree in parks and large gardens. The wood is white, hard and strong, and used for furniture, flooring, wood turning and musical instruments, though the small size of the tree and its relatively slow growth make it an unimportant wood. It has an OPALS rating of 7.

It is locally naturalised in parts of the United States and more rarely in New Zealand.
The hybrid maple Acer × zoeschense has A. campestre as one of its parents.

The tree has gained the Royal Horticultural Society's Award of Garden Merit.

Cultivars
Over 30 cultivars of Acer campestre are known, selected for their foliage or habit, or occasionally both; several have been lost to cultivation.

 'Carnival'
 'Commodore'
 'Compactum'
 'Eastleigh Weeping'
 'Elegant'
 'Elsrijk'
 'Evenly Red'
 'Fastigiatum'
 'Green Weeping'
 'Leprechaun'
 'Lienco'
 'Marjolein'
 'Nanum'
 'Pendulum'
 'Postelense'
 'Pulverulentum'
 'Punctatissimum'
 'Puncticulatum'
 'Queen Elisabeth'
 'Red Shine'
 'Royal Ruby'
 'Ruby Glow'
 'Schwerinii'
 'Senator'
 'Silver Celebration'
 'Silver Dawn'
 'Streetwise'
 'Tauricum'
 'Tomentosum'
 'William Caldwell'
 'Zorgvlied'

BonsaiAcer campestre (and the similar A. monspessulanum) are popular among bonsai enthusiasts. The dwarf cultivar 'Microphyllum' is especially useful in this regard. A. campestre bonsai have an appearance distinct from those selected from some other maples such as A. palmatum with more frilly, translucent, leaves. The shrubby habit and smallish leaves of A. campestre'' respond well to techniques encouraging ramification and leaf reduction.

Gallery

References

Further reading

 

campestre
Flora of North Africa
Garden plants of Asia
Garden plants of Europe
Plants used in bonsai
Trees of Asia
Trees of Western Asia
Trees of Europe
Plants described in 1753
Taxa named by Carl Linnaeus